Danylo Apostol (1654–1734), was a Hetman of Zaporizhian Host from 1727 to 1734.

Brief biography

Born in a Cossack family of Moldavian origin, Danylo Apostol was a prominent military leader, polkovnyk (colonel) of the Myrhorod Regiment, and a participant in the Russian campaigns against the Ottoman Empire and Crimean Khanate. He fought in the Great Northern War between 1701 and 1705 against the Swedes in Livonia and the Polish–Lithuanian Commonwealth, but in 1708 briefly joined Hetman Ivan Mazepa who sided with Charles XII of Sweden against Peter I of Russia. Later, Danylo Apostol again switched sides and fought on the Russian side, distinguishing himself in the Battle of Poltava. In 1722, he led Cossack units during the Russo-Persian War that led to the expansion of Russian power in the Caspian region. Danylo Apostol lost his eye during the capture of Persian Derbent fortress, this will give him a nickname "blind Hetman".

In the 1723-1725 Cossack starshyna, Danylo Apostol was accused of being involved in the alleged mutiny plot of Hetman Pavlo Polubotok and was suspected in treason by Catherine I. In 1727, Apostol was elected to be Hetman of the left-bank Ukraine. During his rule Little Russia and Cossack nobility increased their wealth and estates at the same time as it was further incorporated into the Russian Empire. Danylo Apostol died in 1734, and the new Hetman was not elected until 1750.

Apostol's grandson Joachim A. Gorlenko (1705–1754), the son of his daughter Maria, entered the priesthood of the Russian Orthodox Church and became Ioasaph of Belgorod, who was glorified as a saint in 1911.

External links
 Danylo Apostol at the Encyclopedia of Ukraine

Hetmans of Zaporizhian Host
1654 births
1734 deaths
People from Poltava Oblast
Blind royalty and nobility
Colonels of the Cossack Hetmanate
People of the Russo-Persian Wars
Zaporizhian Cossacks noble families
Ukrainian people of Moldovan descent